The following is the list of squads for each of the 16 teams competing in the FIBA EuroBasket 2003, held in Sweden between 5 and 14 September 2003. Each team selected a squad of 12 players for the tournament.

Group A

Bosnia and Herzegovina

France

Italy

Slovenia

Group B

Germany

Israel

Latvia

Lithuania

Group C

Russia

Serbia and Montenegro

Spain

Sweden

Group D

Croatia

Greece

Turkey

Ukraine

References
 2003 European Championship for Men, FIBA.com.

2003